Age of consent reform is an effort to change age of consent laws. Proposed reforms typically include raising, lowering, or abolishing the age of consent, applying (or not applying) close-in-age exemptions, changing penalties, or changing how cases are examined in court. A related issue is whether or not to enforce ages of consent on homosexual relationships that are different from those enforced on heterosexual relationships. Organized efforts have ranged from academic discussions to political petitions.

Initiatives to change the age of consent
There have been many initiatives to raise and lower the age of consent. Gratian, a canon lawyer in the 12th century, stated that females and males could not consent to betrothal before 7 years of age and consent could not take place for marriage (sexual intercourse) before 12 years of age for females and 14 years of age for males. At that time, the age of consent for marriage (sexual intercourse) was about 12 years old for females and about 14 years old for males, in most European countries. Today age of consent for sexual intercourse is usually set between 14 years old and 18 years old, in Western countries.

Western Europe

United Kingdom

In 1275, the English government set the age of consent at 12 years old for females as part of a rape law and a 1576 law was created with more severe punishments for which the age of consent was set at 10 years old for females. Jurist Sir Matthew Hale stated that both rape laws were valid at the same time.

Age of consent for marriage (sexual intercourse) was set at 12 years old for maidens (girls) and 14 years old for youths (boys), under English common law. Age of majority was set at 21 years old, adolescent males and adolescent females needed parental consent to marry.

In 1875 the Offence Against the Persons Act raised it to 13 in Great Britain and Ireland. The Criminal Law Amendment Act of 1885 raised it to 16. In 1917, a bill raising the age of consent in Great Britain and Ireland from 16 to 17 was defeated by only one vote.  In Northern Ireland in 1950 the legislature of Northern Ireland passed a law called Children and Young Persons Act in 1950 that raised the age of consent from 16 to 17.

In 1929, age of consent for marriage (sexual intercourse) was raised to 16 years old for both, females and males. In 1970, the age of majority was lowered from 21 years old to 18 years old, making it legal for males and females 18 years old and older to marry without parental consent.

France
In 1977 while a reform in the French penal code was under discussion in the parliament, a petition to decriminalize all consensual relations between adults and children/teenagers below the age of fifteen was sent to Parliament but did not succeed in changing the law.  In 1978 the petition was discussed in a broadcast by radio France Culture in the program "Dialogues", with the transcript later published under the title Sexual Morality and the Law in a book by Michel Foucault, later published again under the title The Danger of Child Sexuality. The participants, including Foucault, play-writer/actor Jean Danet and novelist/gay activist Guy Hocquenghem had all signed the petition.

Netherlands
Between 1990 and 2002, the Netherlands operated what was in effect an age of consent of 12, subject to qualifications. The relevant law, passed in November 1990, permitted sexual intercourse for young people between 12 and 16, but allowed a challenge by parents based on erosion of parental authority or child exploitation, which would be heard by a Council for the Protection of Children. In 1979, the Dutch Pacifist Socialist Party supported an unsuccessful petition to lower the age of consent to 12.

Eastern Europe

Russia

Before 1922
Before 1830 the age of consent for marriage (sexual intercourse) was 15 years old for males and 13 years old for females (though 15 years old was preferred for females, so much so that it was written into the Law Code of 1649). Teenage marriage was practised for chastity. Both the female and the male teenager needed consent of their parents to marry because they were under 20 years old, the age of majority. In 1830, the age of consent for marriage (sexual intercourse) was raised to 18 years old for males and 16 years old for females (though 18 years old was preferred for females). The average age of marriage (sexual intercourse) for females was around 19 years old.

After 1991
Russia in 1998 lowered the age of consent from 16 to 14, but in 2002 raised the age of consent from 14 back to 16. Since then penalties have also generally increased. Vladimir Putin said that a party advocating lowering the age of consent cannot be legally registered (hence, be a legal party) in Russia.

North America

Canada

In June 2006, the Canadian government proposed a bill to raise the age of consent from 14 to 16 (in 1890, it was raised from 12 to 14), while creating a near-age exemption for sex between 14- to 15-year-olds and partners less than 5 years older, and keeping an existing near-age clause for sex between 12 and 13 year olds and partners less than 2 years older. The initiative also maintains a temporary exception for already existing marriages of minors 14 and 15 years old to adults, but forbids new marriages like these in the future.  The law took effect May 1, 2008.

United States

18th century
The age of consent in question has to do with the law of rape and not the law of marriage (sexual intercourse) as sometimes misunderstood. Under English common law the age of consent, a part of the law of rape, was 10 or 12 years old and rape was defined as forceful sexual intercourse with a woman against her will. To convict a man of rape, both force and lack of consent had to be proved, except in the case of a girl who is under the age of consent. English common law existed in the British colonies of America and was adopted by Delaware and other states in 1776.

19th and 20th centuries
In Delaware, the age of consent was 10 years old until 1871 when it was lowered to 7 years old. Under the 1871 law, a man was given the death penalty for sex with a girl below the age of consent.

In 1880, 37 states had an age of consent of 10 years, 10 states had an age of consent at 12 years, and Delaware had an age of consent of 7 years.

In the late-19th century, a "social purity movement" composed of Christian feminist reform groups began advocating a raise in the age of consent to 16, with the goal of raising it ultimately to 18. By 1920, 26 states had an age of consent at 16, 21 states had an age of consent at 18, and one state (Georgia) had an age of consent at 14.

Alaska was bought from the Russians and became the 49th state of U.S. in 1959. The age of consent was 16 years old. Hawaii became the 50th state of U.S. in 1959. The age of consent was 14 years old.

Two final states legislating their ages of consent into the 15–18 range were Georgia and Hawaii, from 14 to 16, raised in 1995 and 2001, respectively. One state (Colorado) had the age of consent at 15, having been lowered from 18 years old because age of majority was lowered from 21 years old to 18 in 1970.

Present
As of October 16, 2020, the age of consent in each state in the United States was either 16 years of age, 17 years of age, or 18 years of age.

Alabama
In 2012, Alabama State Representative Mac McCutcheon sponsored a bill to raise the age of consent from 16 to 18. As of February 2023, the age of consent in Alabama remains 16.

Hawaii
In 2001, the legislature in Hawaii voted to raise the age of consent from 14 to 16.

Georgia
In June 2005, a bill was proposed before the General Assembly of Georgia (USA) to raise the age of consent from 16 to 18. The bill failed, however.

Georgia was the most resistant state to raising its age of consent in the early 1900s.  Georgia's age of consent was  10 years old until 1918, at which time the age of consent was raised to 14. After raising the age of consent in 1918, Georgia was the only state in the United States to have an age of consent lower than 16. Georgia's age of consent remained at 14 until 1995, when a bill proposed by senator Steve Langford to make the age of consent 16 passed.

In 2006, following the case of Genarlow Wilson (Wilson v. State), aggravated child molestation was reduced to a misdemeanor with a maximum of one year in prison if the offender was under 19, the victim was either 14 or 15 years old, and the offender is no more than 48 months older than the victim. (Georgia penal code, 16-6-4). Previously aggravated child molestation (at any age) carried 5–20 years imprisonment regardless of the age difference between the victim and offender.

Kentucky
Under Kentucky law, a person who is sixteen years of age or older may consent to a sexual act with a person not more than ten years older than the minor, but otherwise below the age of eighteen is presumed to be incapable of consent to a sexual act. However, where a person is in a position of authority over the minor such as a teacher, coach or relative, whatever the age difference, a minor below the age of eighteen is deemed incapable of consent.

Missouri
In 2008 a bill was introduced in the Missouri legislature to raise the age of consent from 17 to 18. The bill was sponsored by Representative Stanley Cox. The bill did not become law.

South Carolina
In South Carolina in 2007 a bill was proposed before the legislature to raise the age of consent from 16 to 18. It did not succeed.

Wisconsin
Prior to 1981 Wisconsin had an exception to the law that allowed adults who were guilty of sex with minors 15 or older to use as a defense that the victim understood the nature of the sexual act, but there was a rebuttable presumption in Wisconsin that minors under the age of 18 were not capable of informed consent to sex, but as stated, this could be argued against by the defendant in the court of law if the minor was 15 years of age or older. In 1981 the age of consent was lowered from 18 to 16 in Wisconsin, but at the same time it was made an automatic felony to have sex with anyone under 16, informed consent for a 15-year-old was no longer a defense an adult defendant could use in court. In 1983 the age of consent in Wisconsin was raised from 16 to 18, under the new law sex with a minor 16 or older carried the lesser penalty of a Class A Misdemeanor. A marital exemption was included in the law for an adult who was married to a minor 16 or older, but no close-in-age exception was.

South America

Peru
The age of consent in Peru was increased from 14 to 18 in 2006 as elections approached, but in 2007, Peru's new Congress voted to return the age to 14 regardless of gender and/or sexual orientation. However, after strong public opposition, the law was raised back to 18 on June 27, 2007, by a vote of 74 to zero (22 abstentions). It was returned to 14 in December 2012.

Asia

India
In January 2004, a Division bench of the Kerala's High Court in Southern India suggested that the age of consent should be raised from 16 to 18 in that state. Justice R. Basant said he considered "illogic(al)" that a legal system in which an age of 18 is used for other purposes – like the Indian Majority Act, the Contract Act, the Juvenile Justice Act, the Child Marriage Restraint Act and the Representation of People Act – has a different approach in the case of sexual consent. The age of consent in India was raised from 16 to 18 in 2012.

In the West

Male homosexuality

United Kingdom
The male homosexual age of consent in the United Kingdom was set at 21 in the Sexual Offences Act of 1967, lowered to 18 in the Criminal Justice and Public Order Act 1994, and then finally lowered equally to 16 in England and Wales and Scotland in the Sexual Offences (Amendment) Act of 2000. In 1970, the age of majority was lowered from 21 years old to 18 years old.

United States
Philip Jenkins said in the mid-1970s, there was widespread sympathy among homosexual activist groups for lowering the age of consent for all sexual activities with many gay publications discussing lowering it for boys. These tensions and antagonisms continued among activist circles until the 1980s; however, since the 1970s, gay liberationist groups promoting frontline advocacy against the age of consent were falling into decline. In 1971, the age of majority was lowered from 21 years old to 18 years old, except in Mississippi (21), Alabama (19), and Nebraska (19).

Close-in-age exemptions

In the United States, many states have adopted close-in-age exemptions. These laws, known as "Romeo and Juliet laws", provide that a person can legally have consensual sex with a minor provided that he or she is not more than a given number of years older, generally four years or less. Some Romeo and Juliet laws (such as the law in Michigan) do not make it legal for a person below the age of consent to have sex with a slightly older person, but may exempt the older partner from sex offender registration.

Romeo and Juliet laws were passed in 2007 in Connecticut and Indiana. In Indiana, a change in the law decriminalizes consensual sex between adolescents if they are found by a court to be in a "dating relationship" with an age difference of four years or less and other states have adopted other reforms. Michigan passed a Romeo and Juliet Law in 2011.

These reforms have been controversial. In Texas, Governor Rick Perry vetoed Romeo and Juliet laws that had been passed by the legislature in 2009, but signed one in 2011 to go into effect in September of that year. A 2011 Romeo and Juliet bill failed to pass in the Illinois legislature. In the State v. Limon case, Kansas's Romeo and Juliet law was found to be unconstitutional because it excluded same-sex sexual conduct.

Some countries other than the United States also have Romeo and Juliet laws. Ireland's 2006 law has been contested because it treats girls differently from boys.

Advocacy for child-adult relationships
Some pedopiles and their sympathizers have called to abolish the age of consent to allow children and adults to have relationships. Past groups advocating for this include NAMBLA in the United States and Vereniging Martijn in the Netherlands.

See also

 Age of Consent Act, 1891
 Age of consent reform in the United Kingdom
 Age of consent reform in Canada
 Age of consent
 List of countries by age of consent
 Ages of consent in Africa
 Ages of consent in Asia
 Ages of consent in Europe
 Ages of consent in Oceania
 Ages of consent in North America
 Ages of consent in the United States
 Ages of consent in South America
 Age of consent in Brazil
 Half your age plus seven
 Sex education
 Sexual consent in law
 Comprehensive sex education

References

Reform
Reform
Pedophile advocacy